The 2006 ICC Champions Trophy was a One Day International cricket tournament held in India from 7 October to 5 November 2006. It was the fifth edition of the ICC Champions Trophy (previously known as the ICC Knock-out). The tournament venue was not confirmed until mid-2005 when the Indian government agreed that tournament revenues would be free from tax (the 2002 tournament had been due to be held in India, but was switched to Sri Lanka when an exemption from tax in India was not granted). Australia won the tournament, their first Champions Trophy victory. They were the only team to get one loss in the tournament, as all other teams lost at least two matches. West Indies, their final opponents, beat Australia in the group stage but were bowled out for 138 in the final and lost by eight wickets on the Duckworth–Lewis method. West Indies opening batsman Chris Gayle was named Player of the Tournament.

English writer Tim de Lisle said the tournament "had been fun" because "it had been unpredictable." The unpredictability was in part shown by the fact that no Asian side qualified for the semi-final, for the first time in a major ICC tournament since the 1975 World Cup. De Lisle also claimed that "the pitches" had been the "tournament's secret," saying that they were "sporting and quixotic" and "quite untypical of both one-day cricket and the subcontinent." His viewed were echoed by panelists in a roundtable discussion organized by Cricinfo, "who hoped that the tournament would not be a one-off in a batsman-dominated game," according to news site rediff.com. The tournament recorded five of the 10 lowest team totals in the tournament's history, and totals of 80 (for West Indies v Sri Lanka) and 89 (for Pakistan v South Africa) were the lowest recorded in matches involving the top eight ranked One-day International sides of the world.

Qualifying
The Ten full member teams competed in the tournament and were seeded according to the ICC ODI Championship standings on 1 April 2006.  Bangladesh became the last team to qualify, claiming tenth place ahead of Kenya on 23 March 2006. The first six teams on the ICC ODI table (Australia, South Africa, Pakistan, New Zealand, India, and England) qualified automatically; the next four teams (Sri Lanka, the defending champions West Indies, Zimbabwe and Bangladesh) played a pre-tournament round-robin qualifying round from 7 to 14 October to determine which two will proceed to play in the tournament proper.

Tournament structure
Two teams from the qualifying round, plus the other six teams, played in a group stage, split into two groups of four in a round-robin competition, played from 15 to 29 October.

The top two teams from each group qualified for the semi-finals played on 1 November and 2 November. The final was played on 5 November.

Venues 
Matches in the preliminary round and the group round were played in the Punjab Cricket Association Stadium in Mohali, Sardar Patel Stadium in Ahmedabad, the Sawai Man Singh Stadium in Jaipur, and the Brabourne Stadium in Mumbai. The matches in Mumbai were the first ODIs at Brabourne Stadium for 11 years.

The semi-finals are played in Mohali and Jaipur.  The final was played in Mumbai.

Participating teams

The 10 Test-playing nations had taken part.

Umpires and match referees
Three match referees and eight umpires were named for the tournament. Of the ten umpires on the ICC elite panel, neither Darrell Hair, who was not nominated due to security concerns, nor Billy Doctrove was employed for the tournament. Those were two umpires calling Pakistan for ball tampering in August. An ICC spokesman said, "this didn't mean Billy Doctrove is a bad umpire," and that there was "nothing sinister" about the decision.

Match referees

  Mike Procter
  Jeff Crowe
  Ranjan Madugalle

Umpires

  Aleem Dar
  Asad Rauf
  Mark Benson
  Billy Bowden
  Steve Bucknor
  Daryl Harper
  Rudi Koertzen
  Simon Taufel

Qualifying round

West Indies and Sri Lanka had qualified with a game to spare, and their match only determined position on the ICC ODI Championship table as well as group opposition in the main stage.

Group stage

Group A

Group B

Knock-out stage

Semi-finals

Final

Tournament statistics
Statistics include performances in preliminary round matches.

Batting

Bowling

Records
Records broken during the tournament:

 Most consecutive defeats, 9, Zimbabwe (carried over from previous tournaments).
 Most consecutive wins: 6, West Indies (carried over from previous tournaments).
 Number of centuries in a tournament: 3, Chris Gayle
 Most runs in a tournament: 474, Gayle
 Most consecutive ducks: 3, Habibul Bashar (carried over from previous tournaments)
 Youngest centurion in a Champions Trophy: Shahriar Nafees, 123 not out, Bangladesh v Zimbabwe, aged 20 years 261 days.
 Highest third wicket partnership: 165, Upul Tharanga and Kumar Sangakkara, Sri Lanka v Zimbabwe at Sardar Patel Stadium, 10 October.
 Highest fifth wicket partnership: 137, Brian Lara and Runako Morton, West Indies v Australia at Brabourne Stadium, 18 October.
 Highest sixth wicket partnership: 131, Mark Boucher and Justin Kemp, South Africa v Pakistan at Punjab Cricket Association Stadium, 27 October.
 Highest seventh wicket partnership: 103, Jacob Oram and Daniel Vettori, New Zealand v Australia at Punjab Cricket Association Stadium, 1 November.
 Best bowling analysis: 9–2–14–6, Farveez Maharoof, Sri Lanka v West Indies, Brabourne Stadium, 14 October.
 First hat-trick: Jerome Taylor v Australia, Brabourne Stadium, 18 October.

Off the field issues
The BCCI, Indian cricket's governing body, made efforts to ensure that this is the last ICC Champions Trophy. They stated that it was a "financial burden" for host nations and that the ICC should host only one international tournament, the World Cup. However, in April, BCCI president Sharad Pawar said that he would "respect the decision" if the ICC unanimously agreed to keep the Champions Trophy on the calendar.

After the bombings in Mumbai in July 2006, there were concerns raised about the security of players, but no team decided to withdraw on these grounds.

Herschelle Gibbs returned to India for the first time in six years; he had refused to tour the country following the match-fixing scandal on the tour of India in 2000, over fears he might be arrested. He eventually agreed to a questioning session with the Delhi police, incriminating several more people in the scandal.

Pakistan's team composition frequently changed; the original captain Inzamam-ul-Haq was suspended following his decision to forfeit the fourth Test of Pakistan's match against England over an umpiring decision. Younis Khan was instated as captain, withdrew himself, then was appointed for the job again. On 16 October, the day before their first match, Pakistan fast bowlers Mohammad Asif and Shoaib Akhtar were sent home following a positive A sample of a drugs test.

Award ceremony controversy
During the Award ceremony after the finals, Ricky Ponting tapped the shoulders of BCCI President  Sharad Pawar and gestured him to hand over the trophy. Soon after the trophy was handed over, Damien Martyn nudged Sharad Pawar off the stage, eager to relish the moment and to pose for the waiting photographers. Former Indian batsman Sunil Gavaskar who was also present on the stage, later disclosed that one of the Australian team members referred to Pawar as "Hiya Buddy."

Although Pawar tried to play down the incident by stating that "it wasn't intentional," some cricketers, including the usually diplomatic Sachin Tendulkar and Nikhil Chopra reacted strongly to this. In Mumbai, a section of NCP workers took to the streets demanding an apology from the Australian cricket team. Chaggan Bhujbal, a NCP leader, said, "This is an insult to a senior leader. We will make a formal complaint to the Australian embassy." 

The BCCI, however, decided not to complain to Cricket Australia officially. However, the issue soon got resolved when Ricky Ponting tended his apology to Pawar.

See also
2004 ICC Champions Trophy
2007 Cricket World Cup

References

External links
ICC Champions Trophy (International Cricket Council)
2006 Champions Trophy, official site
ICC names Champions Trophy venues (Cricinfo, 12 January 2006)
Groups announced for Champions Trophy (Cricinfo, 2 April 2006)
Venues announced, International Cricket Council press release, 27 April 2006
Match Scorecards (Cricinfo), 1 April 2007
Squads (Cricinfo), 1 April 2007

 
ICC Champions Trophy tournaments
Icc Champions Trophy, 2006
International cricket competitions in 2006
Cricket